James Stratford, PC (19 July 1869 – 17 January 1952) was a South African judge who briefly served as the Chief Justice of the Union of South Africa between 1938 and 1939.

Background
Born in Port Elizabeth, Stratford was educated at St Aiden's College, Grahamstown, then qualified as a surveyor before proceeding to Exeter College, Oxford, where he obtained a BA in Jurisprudence in 1897 and a BCL in 1898. He was called to the English bar by the Inner Temple in 1898 and read in the chambers of George Cave (later the Viscount Cave), who was then a junior barrister at the Chancery bar. He returned to South Africa in 1901 and was admitted to the Cape bar, but transferred to Johannesburg in 1902. He was made King's Counsel in 1912.

In 1921, Stratford was appointed a judge of the Transvaal Provincial Division of the Supreme Court of South Africa. In 1927 he was elevated to the Appellate Division of the Supreme Court. In 1938 he was appointed Chief Justice of the Union of South Africa and sworn of the Privy Council, and retired the following year upon reaching the age of seventy.

References

1869 births
1952 deaths
People from Port Elizabeth
Alumni of Exeter College, Oxford
Members of the Inner Temple
South African barristers
South African Queen's Counsel
South African judges
Chief justices of South Africa